Trent M. D'Antonio (born 14 August 1985) is an Australian professional baseball utility player for the Sydney Blue Sox of the Australian Baseball League. He has previously played for the Florida Marlins organization.

He is the all-time leader for base on balls (228), triples (10) and caught stealing (31) in the Australian Baseball League as of 1 January, 2023.

He was selected Australia national baseball team at 2017 World Baseball Classic, 2018 exhibition games against Japan, 2019 Canberra camp and 2019 WBSC Premier12.

References

External links

1985 births
Living people
Australian expatriate baseball players in the United States
Baseball catchers
Baseball first basemen
Baseball second basemen
Baseball third basemen
Greensboro Grasshoppers players
Jamestown Jammers players
Jupiter Hammerheads players
Sportspeople from Wollongong
Sydney Blue Sox players
2017 World Baseball Classic players